James Darel Carrier (born October 26, 1940) is a former professional basketball player.  Born in Warren County, Kentucky, Carrier played his high school basketball at the now defunct Bristow High School.  A 6'3" guard, Carrier played college basketball at Western Kentucky University under coach E.A. Diddle. Carrier was selected in the 9th round of the 1964 NBA Draft by the St. Louis Hawks. However, Carrier originally played AAU basketball and later signed with and played for the Kentucky Colonels of the rival American Basketball Association (ABA).

Carrier was a three-time ABA All-Star with the Colonels (1968, 1969, 1970), teaming with Louie Dampier to form the most explosive backcourt in the ABA; in each of the league's first three seasons, both averaged at least 20 points per game. Carrier played for the Memphis Tams during the 1972–73 season and then retired from pro basketball with 7,011 career points.

He is a member of the ABA All-Time Team and had the highest career 3 point shooting percentage in ABA history.

Carrier and his wife, Donna, a retired schoolteacher live on a farm just west of Oakland, Kentucky.  They have two sons, Jonathan and Josh. The Carrier's youngest son, Josh, played basketball for the University of Kentucky for Tubby Smith. Like his father, he was also a guard.

He played for the United States men's national basketball team at the 1967 FIBA World Championship.

References

External links
Career Stats

1940 births
Living people
American men's basketball players
Basketball players at the 1967 Pan American Games
Basketball players from Kentucky
Kentucky Colonels players
Memphis Tams players
Pan American Games gold medalists for the United States
Pan American Games medalists in basketball
People from Warren County, Kentucky
Phillips 66ers players
Shooting guards
St. Louis Hawks draft picks
United States men's national basketball team players
Western Kentucky Hilltoppers basketball players
Medalists at the 1967 Pan American Games
1967 FIBA World Championship players